Overwatch 2 is a 2022 first-person shooter game by Blizzard Entertainment. As a sequel and replacement to the 2016 hero shooter Overwatch, the game intends a shared environment for player-versus-player (PvP) modes while introducing persistent cooperative modes. A major change in PvP modes was to reduce team sizes from six to five. Several major characters were also reworked. Overwatch 2 is free-to-play on Nintendo Switch, PlayStation 4, PlayStation 5, Windows, Xbox One, and Xbox Series X/S in early access on October 4 and features full cross-platform play.

Gameplay

Overwatch 2 is a hero shooter, where players are split into two teams and select a "hero" from a roster of 35 characters. Characters are organized into a "damage" class, responsible for offensive efforts; a "support" class, responsible for healing and buffing; and a "tank" class, responsible for the team's protection. Each character has a unique set of skills, made up of active, passive, and ultimate abilities. Overwatch 2, like its predecessor, primarily centers on player versus player (PvP) combat across several different modes and maps, and includes both casual and ranked competitive matches.

The original Overwatch was designed for six-on-six team combat, with two of each class on a team. In Overwatch 2, the number of tank slots was reduced by one, bringing the total number of players per team to five. According to game director Aaron Keller, developers hoped that losing a tank would speed up gameplay as they believed that the original six players scheme rendered gameplay slow. It is also intended to ease the amount of things players and spectators need to watch out for. New maps were designed to include more cover options to compensate for reduced tank-based protection. Additionally, damage class heroes now have an increased movement speed, support heroes slowly regenerate, and tank heroes were redesigned so they could take on a more offensive role. Heroes were visually refurbished as to reflect the passage of time since the events of the first game. Overwatch 2 includes a ping system to direct the attention of teammates to specific points on the map.

The game also introduces a new PvP mode named "Push", similar to tug of war, in which teams vie for control of a robot that pushes a team's payload to the opponent's side of the map. Along with being incorporated into Unranked and Competitive play, Push has become part of the standard map rotation of the Overwatch League, replacing the Assault mode. Some existing gameplay modes may be dropped in Overwatch 2; former game director Jeff Kaplan has stated that some Assault maps (colloquially referred to as "2CP", meaning "two control points"), such as Paris and Horizon Lunar Colony, will likely not be available in Overwatch 2 as these have been deemed unbalanced in response to community feedback. Other Assault maps, such as Hanamura and Temple of Anubis, may be available in the form of custom games or non-competitive arcade modes.

The game features player versus environment (PvE) game modes. Similar to the special seasonal events, they will consist of four-player cooperative missions against non-playable characters and are available on a permanent as opposed to a seasonal basis. In this mode, players can garner experience points for their hero and unlock new passive abilities called "talents", allowing them to influence how the hero plays. There are least two PvE modes; a story-based mission mode, where players are limited to their hero selection in replaying missions based on Overwatch lore, and Hero missions which allow all heroes to be used in fending off waves of enemies at various locations. Blizzard anticipates that Overwatch 2 will offer over 100 different PvE missions, utilizing new maps as well as existing multiplayer maps expanded out to include new areas, and adding in dynamic effects, such as day and night times as well as varying weather conditions. Enemy types are expanded out from the Null Sector robots that were introduced in the original seasonal PvE events, adding in new types with unique behaviors.

Overwatch 2 was released as free-to-play as opposed to the premium monetization model of its predecessor. It also discontinued loot boxes in favor of a battle pass system which is offered on a seasonal basis and corresponds with the introduction of new maps and heroes. The game also includes an in-game store where players can purchase cosmetics directly. Blizzard stated that new heroes will be introduced as rewards on the free tier of the battle pass, and players who fail to make the associated tier will have other routes to obtain the hero for free in later seasons.

A Blizzard Battle.net account is required to play Overwatch 2, regardless of platform. Overwatch 2 features cross-progression, with in-game cosmetic items and progress being shared across PC and console versions. Unlocked cosmetic items, in-game currency, and player statistics from any Overwatch profile linked to such an account are merged, and are available on all platforms. Competitive skill ratings are separate, with console and PC ranks remaining independent of each other.

Development
Overwatch 2 was announced at BlizzCon on November 1, 2019, with plans that the game would maintain a "shared multiplayer environment" between it and the original Overwatch, so that players in either game could compete in the existing player versus player (PvP) game modes, retaining all unlocked cosmetics and other features. Jeff Kaplan, director for Overwatch, explained that this was a major decision and that he had to justify this "player-first standpoint" to Blizzard executives, given the current industry trend to draw in new sales. All new heroes, maps, and PvP modes were to be added to both games to maintain this shared environment. However, Overwatch 2 was later announced as a free-to-play title, and that on its release on October 4, 2022, Blizzard affirmed that Overwatch 2 live services would replace those of the original game; the original Overwatch servers would be shut down on October 2, 2022. Players retained their existing cosmetics and in-game currency, with remaining loot boxes opened automatically upon the release of Overwatch 2. At least three new heroes were announced to be added to the roster, including Sojourn, a Canadian Overwatch officer, Junker Queen, the ruler of Junkertown, and Kiriko, the protector of Kanezaka.

Overwatch 2 runs on an upgraded version of the original game's engine which allows for larger map sizes to better support the new story-based PvE elements. Additionally, all of the existing heroes received visual redesigns for Overwatch 2, although Blizzard did not expect every hero to have their redesigns finished when the game launched. Twelve of the existing 31 redesigns were completed at the time of Overwatch 2s reveal. 

Overwatch 2 was released for Nintendo Switch, PlayStation 4, PlayStation 5, Windows, Xbox One, and Xbox Series X/S in early access on October 4, 2022. Kaplan stated when the game was announced that they were more concerned about quality of the product than timeliness of the release. Investor documents released in November 2021 reported that the initial 2022 release window was delayed to at least 2023, intended for "giving the teams some extra time to complete production and continue growing their creative resources to support the titles after launch". Kaplan anticipated that Overwatch and Overwatch 2 will ultimately merge into a single product to avoid having any engine differences affecting player experience. Technical director John Lafleur has stated they are also interested in supporting, at minimum, cross-platform progression and are looking at the possibility of cross-platform play. In the interim from its announcement prior to release, Kaplan left Blizzard in April 2021, with Aaron Keller taking over the lead development role, while the lead developer for new heroes, Geoff Goodman, left sometime in mid-2022.

In March 2022, Blizzard stated that they had put too much focus on Overwatch 2 over the past few years to the detriment of support for the original game, and so changed plans to release Overwatch 2 in parts, with the PvP portion to be released in beta form starting in April 2022 and the PvE part to come at a later time. This would allow them to also continue to support Overwatch alongside Overwatch 2 development. Later, Blizzard announced that the first wave of Overwatch 2 invitation-only betas would begin on April 26, 2022, and end on May 17. Access to the closed beta could be earned either by signing up for a chance to participate or by watching select Twitch streamers for a limited time on April 27.

The game without its PVE mode was released as early access on October 4, 2022, for Windows, PlayStation 4 and 5, Xbox One and Series X/S, and Nintendo Switch. That day, in addition to a large number of players, the game's servers were hit with a distributed denial of service (DDOS) attack that made it difficult for many to access the game. Additionally, as part of Blizzard's efforts to reduce smurfing, the use of new accounts by experienced players as to try to game the system, the company required all players to confirm their identity through a SMS message on their cell phone linked to their account. For many with prepaid cellular plans, particularly in the United States, they cannot use SMS on their plans, and effectively locked them out of Overwatch 2, though Blizzard stated they were working to resolve that issue. By October 7, Blizzard removed the need to verify one's identity for those that had played Overwatch since at least June 2021. As a means to make up this lost time to players, Blizzard planned to offer double experience point weekends and free cosmetic items to all players.

Reception

Overwatch 2 received "generally favorable" reviews from critics upon release according to review aggregator Metacritic.

Tyler Colp of PC Gamer was critical of Blizzard's handling of the sequel, writing that the game "intentionally or not, is trying to bury its predecessor alive." Colp added, "the original Overwatch is still in there, bruised and broken, but the weight of Blizzard's commercial and competitive expectations keeps piling up."

On the game's 5v5 gameplay dynamic, as opposed to its predecessor's 6v6 dynamic, IGNs Simon Cardy wrote: "it fully drags Overwatch 2 out of the stagnant meta swamp its predecessor found itself in over the past couple of years, but also denies itself some of the lustre of its satisfying team play." Cardy also wrote "if the pertinent question to ask about Overwatch 2 is simply if it's a fun game, then the answer right now is yes. It's still a fundamentally great hero shooter, just one that is perhaps not currently operating at the towering height of its powers."

Jessica Howard of GameSpot wrote, "Overwatch 2 takes the franchise from a genre-defining shooter to a trend-chasing one. As such, it has begun to feel less like a unique sci-fi, superhero comic book in video game form, and more like, well, a lot of other games." Chris Carter of Destructoid wrote that "Overwatch 2 doesn't have the same cachet that Overwatch 1 did, but I can still see myself jumping in for a few matches after a long evening. The charm is still there, even if the delivery system has been muddled, and the game is no longer a premium product with easy-access characters that you can readily jump in and out of. Perhaps the PVE update can change that, but it has some work to do."

The game's removal of loot boxes in favor of a battle pass system received backlash. Players directed criticism toward Blizzard's decision to lock the character Kiriko as a free reward on the first season's battle pass. Following Kiriko's reveal trailer, CJ Wheeler of Rock Paper Shotgun wrote: "One look at PlayOverwatch's mentions on Twitter is, well, eye-opening. It reveals so much criticism of the battle passes, from cries of pay to win to complaints about the grind before the game's even dropped. There are quite a few accusations that Blizzard are money-hungry too." Further criticism was levied at both the pricing of cosmetic items found with the in-game shop, as well as the time it would take to unlock cosmetics solely through grinding for those players who opt not to using real money within the shop. Many players and some games jounalists highlighted that most other games include enough in-game currency in the battle pass to get the next one free.

Over 35 million users played Overwatch 2 in its first month of release in early access, compared to Overwatch which had only 15 million players three months after release.

It was nominated for the British Academy Games Award for Multiplayer at the 19th British Academy Games Awards.

Notes

References

External links
 

2022 video games
Asymmetrical multiplayer video games
Blizzard games
Competitive games
Cooperative video games
Early access video games
Esports games
First-person shooter multiplayer online games
First-person shooters
Free-to-play video games
Hero shooters
Multiplayer online games
Multiplayer video games
Nintendo Switch games
Online-only games
Overwatch
PlayStation 4 games
PlayStation 4 Pro enhanced games
Science fiction video games
Superhero video games
Transmedia storytelling
Video games about robots
Video games based on Japanese mythology
Video games containing battle passes
Video games developed in the United States
Video game sequels
Video games set in Antarctica
Video games set in Australia
Video games set in Brazil
Video games set in China
Video games set in Cuba
Video games set in Egypt
Video games set in France
Video games set in Germany
Video games set in Gibraltar
Video games set in Greece
Video games set in India
Video games set in Iraq
Video games set in Italy
Video games set in Japan
Video games set in Jordan
Video games set in London
Video games set in Los Angeles
Video games set in Mexico
Video games set in Monaco
Video games set in Nepal
Video games set in New Mexico
Video games set in New York City
Video games set in Nigeria
Video games set in Portugal
Video games set in Rome
Video games set in Saint Petersburg
Video games set in South Korea
Video games set in Sweden
Video games set in Sydney
Video games set in Thailand
Video games set in the 2070s
Video games set in Toronto
Video games set in Venice
Video games with cross-platform play
Video games with user-generated gameplay content
Windows games
Xbox One games
Xbox One X enhanced games